The News Hour with Mark Austin is a weekday news programme in the United Kingdom on Sky News, presented by Mark Austin. It combines rolling-news coverage with analysis and interviews on the day's issues. The show airs between 5 pm7 pm Monday to Friday.

Broadcasts

The News Hour was the name initially given to the 5pm hour of Sky News only with Sky News at Six following after, also presented by Austin. As of 2020, the 6 pm hour is branded as the News Hour at Six  The show is broadcast as two distinctive hour long programmes with the days news summarised in each.

Mark Austin presents most Monday to Thursday programmes and occasionally hosts the show on Fridays, however, typically Jonathan Samuels presents most Friday editions. Austin is, however, the only presenter referenced in the show title with the slot branded as simply The News Hour when any other Sky presenter host the programme. Other relief presenters include Tom Macleod and Isabel Webster.

The show is currently broadcast from the "Glass Box", actually Studio 21, Sky Central, Osterley. but during the 2022 Russian invasion of Ukraine, the show was presented live from Kyiv

Presenters

References

2018 British television series debuts
2020s British television series
Sky News
Sky television news shows
Sky UK original programming
English-language television shows